Nefyn United F.C. is a football club from Nefyn in Wales. They play in the North Wales Coast West Football League Premier Division.

History
Nefyn United had been a regular fixture in the Welsh Alliance League, finishing around the mid-table for nine seasons after gaining promotion from the Gwynedd League in 2005. However, disaster struck before the 2014–15 season when manager Geraint Evans resigned from his post to become station officer at the local fire station, leaving the club without a manager for the upcoming season. Unable to find a suitable replacement in time, the club decided to move back to the Gwynedd League, now two tiers below where they had been competing because of the introduction of the Welsh Alliance League Division 2 in 2010.

The club finished the 2014–15 season in the Gwynedd League in 6th place.
In 2017–18 Nefyn reached three finals, losing in extra time to Gwalchmai 2–1 in the Safeflue Cup and losing to Bro Goronwy in the Bob Owen Memorial Cup. In the Junior cup they beat Bontnewydd after extra time 4–2.

Non-playing staff

League history

References

External links
  Official Website

Football clubs in Wales
Welsh Alliance League clubs
Association football clubs established in 1932
1932 establishments in Wales
Gwynedd League clubs
North Wales Coast Football League clubs
Caernarfon & District League clubs
Bangor & District League clubs
Nefyn